= 1952–53 Plunket Shield season =

Cricket tournament in New Zealand

1952–53 Plunket Shield
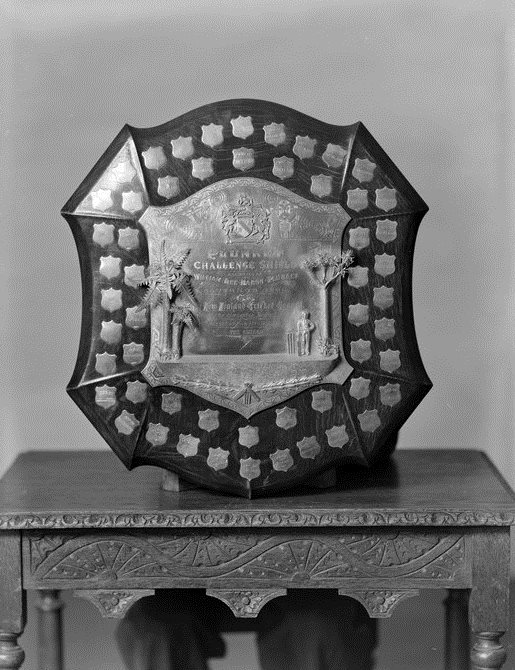
- The Plunket Shield trophy
- Cricket format: First-class
- Tournament format(s): Round-robin
- Champions: Otago (5th title)
- Participants: 5
- Matches: 10

The 1952–53 Plunket Shield season was a tournament of the Plunket Shield, the domestic first-class cricket competition of New Zealand.

Otago won the championship, finishing at the top of the points table at the end of the round-robin tournament between the five first-class sides, Auckland, Canterbury, Central Districts, Otago and Wellington. Eight points were awarded for a win, four points for having a first innings lead in a draw and two points for a first innings deficit in a draw.

== Table ==
Below are the Plunket Shield standings for the season:

Team	Played	Won	Lost	Drawn	Points	NetRpW
Otago	4	3	1	0	24	5.006
Central Districts	4	1	1	2	16	11.217
Auckland	4	2	2	0	16	-3.420
Canterbury	4	1	1	2	14	1.659
Wellington	4	0	2	2	4	-12.221
